Gladys Phillips (1912 – March 26, 2000) was an American politician who served as a member of the Washington House of Representatives from 1951 to 1953.  She represented Washington's 21st legislative district as a Republican.

Personal life and education

Phillips was the daughter of Ernestine and James Marston Phillips.  Her father was an attorney and politician who served as mayor of the family's home town of Aberdeen, Washington; a Washington State legislator; and eventually a judge in superior court for Grays Harbor County.

She attended University of Washington for both her bachelor's and law degrees, graduating as one of six women in the University of Washington School of Law class of 1935.  In 1947, she married Lester "Pinky" O'Day, an insurance agent.

Legislative career
She served only one term in the legislature, later telling The Daily World that she "didn't care for the legislature" because it "didn't matter how hard you worked", and that she went to the legislature to work, but found that "[t]here was all kinds of monkey business up there."

Career outside the legislature
For over sixty years, she ran a prominent law firm in Aberdeen.

References

Further reading
 Robinson, Herb, “Like Father, Like Daughter,” The Seattle Times, January 11, 1951
 Spitzer, Judith, “Women’s History Month Spotlight,” The Daily World, March 19, 2000
 Spitzer, Judith, “Gladys Phillips, inspirational attorney, dies,” The Daily World, April 1, 2000
 “Gladys and Joe,” The Daily World, April 1, 2000
 Hughes, John, “The Greatest Women in Harbor History?” The Daily World, August 8, 2004

1912 births
2000 deaths
Washington (state) Republicans
Members of the Washington House of Representatives
Women state legislators in Washington (state)